Musser's shrew mouse (Pseudohydromys musseri) is a species of rodent in the family Muridae. It is found only in Papua New Guinea. Its natural habitat is subtropical or tropical moist montane forests.

References

Pseudohydromys
Rodents of Papua New Guinea
Mammals described in 1989
Taxonomy articles created by Polbot
Rodents of New Guinea